Saint-Jean-le-Vieux is a commune in the Pyrénées-Atlantiques department in south-western France.

History
The town of Saint-Jean-le-Vieux was razed to the ground in 1177 by the troops of Richard the Lionheart after a siege. The Kings of Navarre refounded the town at nearby Saint-Jean-Pied-de-Port as the regional capital shortly afterwards. Saint-Jean-le-Vieux was also resettled.

See also
Communes of the Pyrénées-Atlantiques department

References

External links

 DONAZAHARRE in the Bernardo Estornés Lasa - Auñamendi Encyclopedia (Euskomedia Fundazioa) (in Spanish)
 Public school (in French)
 Lake of Harrieta (in French)

Lower Navarre
Communes of Pyrénées-Atlantiques
Pyrénées-Atlantiques communes articles needing translation from French Wikipedia